Mekényes is a village in Hegyhát District, northern Baranya county, in the Southern Transdanubia region of Hungary. Its population at the 2011 census was 289.

Geography 
It is part of the Southern Transdanubia statistical region, and administratively it falls under Baranya County and Hegyhát District.

Demographics

2011 census 
As of the census of 2011, there were 289 residents, 121 households, and 82 families living in the village. The population density was 42 inhabitants per square mile (16/km2). There were 143 dwellings at an average density of 21 per square mile (8/km2). The average household size was 2.36. The average number of children was 0.85. The average family size was 2.82.

Religious affiliation was 43.2% Roman Catholic, 12.6% Lutheran, 5.6% Calvinist, 0.4% Greek Catholic, 1.4% other religion and 6.3% unaffiliated, with 30.5% declining to answer.

The village had an ethnic minority German population of 7.7% and a Roma population of 2.1%. A small number of residents also identified as Romanian (1.1%) and other, non-native to Hungary (1.4%). The majority declared themselves as Hungarian (71.2%), with 27.4% declining to answer.

Local government 
The village is governed by a mayor with a four-person council. The local government of the village operates a joint council office with the nearby localities of Alsómocsolád, Mágocs, and Nagyhajmás. The seat of the joint council is in Mágocs.

Transportation

Railway 
The station is on the Pusztaszabolcs–Pécs railway line and is operated by MÁV.

External links 
 OpenStreetMap
 Detailed Gazetteer of Hungary

Notes

References

Populated places in Baranya County